The mixed skeet was a shooting sports event held as part of the Shooting at the 1968 Summer Olympics programme. The competition was held on 21 and 22 October 1968 at the shooting ranges in Mexico City. 52 shooters from 30 nations competed.

Final standing

References

Shooting at the 1968 Summer Olympics